The 2010–2011 East Carolina Pirates men's basketball team represented East Carolina University during the 2010–2011 NCAA Division I basketball season. The Pirates were coached by first year head coach Jeff Lebo, who previously coached at Auburn. The Pirates played their home games at Williams Arena at Minges Coliseum and are members of Conference USA. They finished the season 18–16, 8–8 in C-USA play and lost in the semifinals of the 2011 Conference USA men's basketball tournament to Memphis. They received an invitation to the 2011 CollegeInsider.com Tournament where they lost in the first round to Jacksonville.

Recruiting

Roster

Schedule

|-
!colspan=9 style=|Exhibition

|-
!colspan=9 style=|Regular Season

|-
!colspan="9" style=| Conference USA Tournament

|-
!colspan="9" style=| CollegeInsider.com Tournament

|-

Player Awards
Brock Young – 2010 C-USA Sixth Man of the Year
Darrius Morrow – 2010 C-USA All Tournament Team
Jontae Sherrod - 2010 All C-USA Third Team

References

East Carolina Pirates men's basketball seasons
East Carolina
East Carolina
East Carolina Pirates
East Carolina Pirates